Yana Ross is a Latvian-American director.

Career 
She directed the plays Sleeping Beauty and Bambiland by Elfriede Jelinek, and has worked internationally from Volksbühne am Rosa-Luxemburg-Platz to Seoul Performing Arts Festival in South Korea, Lithuanian National Drama Theater, Finnish National Theater (Finland), Barka Theater (Hungary), Uppsala Stadsteater (Sweden), Laźnia Nowa  and TR Warszawa  (Poland) and Reykjavik City Theater (Iceland). Ross is a Fulbright Fellowship recipient. She received the John Gassner Memorial prize for her work on Russian Theater of the 21st Century, a special project in her role as managing editor at Yale Theater magazine. She has received Best Director awards in Sweden, Poland and Lithuania and her work is currently touring to Vienna, New York and China. She was a resident director at the Schauspielhaus Zùrich and from 2023 starts long-term collaboration with Berliner Ensemble.

Personal life 
Ross was born in 1973 Moscow to Jewish/Ukrainian/Polish family, grew up in Latvia till age 7. She studied at GITIS (Russian Institute of Theatre Arts) and then moved to the United States in her teens. She obtained a degree in mass-communications and later received her Master of Fine Arts degree from the Yale School of Drama in 2006. She was working as a television producer in New York when she witnessed the September 11th attacks. She returned to work in Europe in 2007.

Theater

References

External links
 

1973 births
Living people
Latvian theatre directors
American theatre directors
Women theatre directors
Latvian emigrants to the United States